Mecher is a village in the commune of Lac de la Haute-Sûre, in north-western Luxembourg.  , the village has a population of 60.

Mecher was a commune in the canton of Wiltz until 1 January 1979, when it was merged with the commune of Harlange to form the new commune of Lac de la Haute-Sûre.  The law creating Lac de la Haute-Sûre was passed on 23 December 1978.

Former commune
The former commune consisted of the villages:

 Bavigne
 Kaundorf
 Liefrange
 Mecher
 Nothum
 Dénkert (Dünkrodt) (lieu-dit)

Footnotes

Villages in Luxembourg
Lac de la Haute-Sûre
Former communes of Luxembourg